The Road to Webequie is a Canadian short documentary film, directed by Tess Girard and Ryan Noth and released in 2016. The film profiles the Webequie First Nation, a remote Nishnawbe Aski community in Northern Ontario, and the potential impacts both positive and negative of the Ontario provincial government's plan to build the community's first all-weather road access as part of the Northern Ontario Ring of Fire mining development.

The film had its world premiere at the 2016 Toronto International Film Festival. It was a shortlisted Canadian Screen Award nominee for Best Short Documentary Film at the 5th Canadian Screen Awards in 2017.

References

External links

, posted by BravoFACT

2016 films
Canadian short documentary films
Documentary films about First Nations
Films shot in Ontario
2010s English-language films
2010s Canadian films
2016 short documentary films